The Shirley wound drain or sump drain is a suction drain with an intake tube that provides air to the bottom of the main tube. This allows a continuous flow of suction so that the tube doesn't get blocked. The Shirley drain is a double-lumen drainage tube intended to aspirate efficiently the contents of a fresh surgical wound. It removes the blood oozing from the walls of the wound cavity before it clots.

History 
The Shirley drain was invented in 1957 by surgeon and inventor Dr. Harold W. Andersen.

References 

Medical equipment
Medical pumps